Dorothy Rosenman (1900 – 17 January 1991) was an expert on housing, a lifelong advocate for low-cost housing and an author.

Early life and education 
Rosenman was born Dorothy Ruben in New York City. She graduated from the Montessori Training School in 1918, while also attending Columbia University.

Career 

Rosenman worked to educate both the public and legislators about the need for community improvement and planning.

Rosenman's career in public housing began in the 1920s, when asked by Ira Robbins (chairman of the housing committee of the United Neighborhood Houses, to amend old tenement laws.

During the early years of World War II, Rosenman spent time in Washington, D.C., urging the United States War Department to release much-needed materials for emergency housing. She served as the chairman of the National Committee on the Housing Emergency.

Rosenman served on many committees throughout her career, including NYC Mayor Fiorello LaGuardia's Committee on Housing Legislation. She served as chairman and organizer of the National Committee on Housing, Inc., as chairman of the committee working to create a New York State Division of Housing, and as chairman of the Housing Committee of the United Neighborhood Houses of New York. The latter worked for better housing conditions on the Lower East Side of New York.

In addition to books, Rosenman wrote many magazine articles on housing.

Personal life 
Dorothy was married to Samuel Rosenman, a lawyer and Democratic speechwriter. The pair were working together on their book Presidential Style; after Samuel died, in 1973, the couple's editor, Cass Canfield, encouraged Dorothy to finish the book.

Dorothy and her husband had two sons.

Publications 

 Rosenman, Dorothy. A Million Homes a Year. Harcourt, Brace and Co., 1945.
 Rosenman, Dorothy. Needed: Five Million Homes. National Committee on Housing, 1945.
 Rosenman, Dorothy and Samuel Rosenman, Presidential Style: Some Giants and a Pygmy in the White House. Harper & Row, 1976.

References

External links 

 Dorothy Rosenman papers at Columbia University Libraries
 Reminiscences of Dorothy R. Rosenman (oral history) at Columbia University Libraries
 Oral History Interview with Dorothy Rosenman at Columbia University Libraries

1900 births
1991 deaths
American housing activists
American political activists
American social activists
20th-century American women writers